Danny Allan (born 9 April 1989 in York, North Yorkshire, England) is a professional rugby league footballer who most recently played for Oxford Rugby League in League 1. He previously played for the York City Knights, the Hunslet Hawks, the Featherstone Rovers and Doncaster in the Championship, and for the Leeds Rhinos in the Super League.

Playing career

References

External links
Leeds Rhinos profile

1989 births
Living people
Doncaster R.L.F.C. players
English rugby league players
Featherstone Rovers players
Hunslet R.L.F.C. players
Leeds Rhinos players
Oxford Rugby League players
Rugby league five-eighths
Rugby league players from York
York City Knights players